Sir John Maynard K.B. (1592–1658) was an English politician.

Origins
Maynard was the second son of Sir Henry Maynard, of Estaines Parva, in Essex, and Susan, the daughter of Thomas Pearson. His elder brother, William, was the first Lord Maynard. His early education is unknown, but it is known that he attended the Inner Temple in 1610.

Political career

Maynard was elected MP for Chippenham in March 1624 and 1625.

He was made a Knight of the Bath on 2 February 1626, the day of Charles I's coronation.

He was elected as Member of Parliament for Calne in 1626 and for Lostwithiel for the Long Parliament in 1646. He proposed that the army should be disbanded and on 16 June 1647, he was one of eleven members of the House of Commons charged by the army with obstructing the business of Ireland, acting against the army and against the laws and liberties of the subject, and with being obstructors of justice. On 20 July, leave of absence was granted to these members for six months and it is probable that Maynard left for the country. In 1648, he was imprisoned for a time in the Tower of London on charges of treason (though eventually released). While imprisoned, he addressed a remonstrance to the House of Lords, claiming his right to a trial by his peers.

Death and posterity
Maynard ultimately inherited his father's estate in Tooting. He died on 29 July 1658 and is buried in Tooting Churchyard (along with his son and heir, also Sir John Maynard, who died in 1664). He married Mary, the daughter of Sir Thomas Myddelton, of Chirk Castle, Denbighshire, and had by her three sons and two daughters, four of whom died without issue. His daughter Anne married Sir John Musters of Colwick in Nottinghamshire. Sir John Maynard the Younger left an only daughter and heir, Mary, who married (first) William Adams, (secondly) Sir Rushout Cullen and (thirdly) Francis Buller of Chillingham, Cornwall.

Maynard is included in a very detailed etching: "Charles I Demanding in the House of Commons the Five Impeached Members".

References

1592 births
1658 deaths
Knights of the Bath
Members of the pre-1707 English Parliament for constituencies in Cornwall
English MPs 1624–1625
English MPs 1625
English MPs 1626
English MPs 1640–1648
Prisoners in the Tower of London
Roundheads
Eleven Members
Myddelton family